Thomas "Tom" Patrick Lavery (18 December 1911 – 7 February 1987) was a South African sprinter and hurdler. He competed at the 1936 Summer Olympics in 110 metre hurdles and 4×100 metre relay, but failed to reach the finals. At the 1938 Empire Games he won the gold medal in the 120 yards hurdles. In the 100 yards event he finished fourth. Twelve years later he won the bronze medal in the 120 yards hurdles at the 1950 Empire Games.

References

1911 births
1987 deaths
South African male sprinters
South African male hurdlers
Olympic athletes of South Africa
Athletes (track and field) at the 1936 Summer Olympics
Athletes (track and field) at the 1938 British Empire Games
Athletes (track and field) at the 1950 British Empire Games
Commonwealth Games gold medallists for South Africa
Commonwealth Games bronze medallists for South Africa
Commonwealth Games medallists in athletics
Scottish emigrants to South Africa
20th-century South African people
Medallists at the 1938 British Empire Games
Medallists at the 1950 British Empire Games